Dan Moore Jr. (born September 28, 1998) is an American football offensive tackle for the Pittsburgh Steelers of the National Football League (NFL). He played college football at Texas A&M and was drafted by the Steelers in the fourth round of the 2021 NFL Draft.

Professional career

Moore was drafted by the Pittsburgh Steelers in the fourth round, 128th overall, of the 2021 NFL Draft. On May 18, 2021, Moore signed his four-year rookie contract with Pittsburgh. He was named the Steelers starting left tackle to begin the 2021 season.

References

External links
Pittsburgh Steelers bio
Texas A&M Aggies bio

1998 births
Living people
American football offensive tackles
Pittsburgh Steelers players
Players of American football from Texas
Sportspeople from Beaumont, Texas
Texas A&M Aggies football players